de Fresne, DeFrense, de-fresne or variant, may refer to:

 Fresne
 du Fresne
 le Fresne
 Chevalier de Fresne (Knight of Fresne)
 Camille Charles Leclerc, chevalier de Fresne
 Seigneur de Fresne (Lord of Fresne)
 Florimond II Robertet, seigneur de Fresne